The Payback Press was a specialist imprint of Canongate Books devoted to (initially) reprints of classic black crime novels, which later branched out into contemporary black fiction.  Notable authors included Chester Himes and Clarence Cooper Jr and Iceberg Slim.  As with Rebel Inc., after its successful foundation in the late 1990s, it was discontinued due to a financial crisis in its parent company.

Notable books published by Payback Press

Fiction 

 Black, Clarence Cooper, Jr.
 The Farm, Clarence Cooper, Jr.
 The Scene, Clarence Cooper, Jr.
 Weed & The Syndicate, Clarence Cooper, Jr.
 Howard Street, Nathan Heard
 The Harlem Cycle (Volumes 1-3), Chester Himes
 The Lonely Crusade, Chester Himes
 Not Without Laughter, Langston Hughes
 One People, Guy Kennaway
 Under African Skies, ed. by Charles Larson
 Indaba, My Children, Credo Mutwa
 Portrait of a Young Man Drowning, Charles Perry
 Giveadamn Brown, Robert Deane Pharr
 The Nigger Factory, Gil Scott-Heron
 The Vulture, Gil Scott-Heron
 Corner Boy, Herbert Simmons
 Man Walking on Eggshells, Herbert Simmons
 Death Wish, Iceberg Slim
 Airtight Willie and Me, Iceberg Slim
 Long White Con, Iceberg Slim
 Mama Black Widow, Iceberg Slim
 Trick Baby, Iceberg Slim
 Doom Fox, Iceberg Slim
 The Jones Men, Vern Smith
 Panther, Melvin Van Peebles
 One for New York, John A. Williams
 Spooks, Spies, and Private Eyes, ed. by Paula L. Woods

Non-fiction 

 Fight the Power, Chuck D
 The New Beats, S.H. Fernando, Jr.
 Born Fi' Dead, Laurie Gunst
 Blues People, LeRoi Jones (Amiri Baraka)
 Beneath the Underdog, Charles Mingus
 Black Fire, Nelson Peery
 Black Talk, Ben Sidran
 Pimp, Iceberg Slim
 The Naked Soul of Iceberg Slim, Iceberg Slim
 Space is the Place, John F. Szwed
 Sweet Sweeback's Badasssss Song, Melvin Van Peebles

Poetry 

 The Fire People, ed. by Lemn Sissay

External links
Canongate index of reviews

Book publishing companies of the United Kingdom

African-American literature